FK506-binding protein 8 is a protein that in humans is encoded by the FKBP8 gene.

The protein encoded by this gene is a member of the immunophilin protein family, which play a role in immunoregulation and basic cellular processes involving protein folding and trafficking. Unlike the other members of the family, this encoded protein does not seem to have PPIase/rotamase activity. It may have a role in neurons associated with memory function.

References

Further reading

EC 5.2.1